Tissa Srilal Abeykoon (31 December 1953 – 16 April 2020 as ශ්‍රීලාල් අබේකෝන්) [Sinhala]), was an actor in Sri Lankan cinema, theater and television. One of the most popular television actors in Sri Lanka, he is most notable for the trade mark role "Appuwa" in the television serial Kopi Kade. A talented singer, Abeykoon is the only Sri Lankan singer to sing 500 songs for cassette after singer Nihal Nelson.

Personal life
He was born on 31 December 1953. Born in Rajagiriya, he was educated at Diyawanna Vidyalaya and Hewavitharana Vidyalaya. He was also educated at Walisingha Harischandra Maha Vidyalaya, Anuradhapura.

He was married to Dominica Wasana Meethani Wijenayake and the couple has two children. He lived in Bothale area in Ambepussa before his demise.

Abeykoon had been ill for nearly five years and received treatment at Mirigama and Ragama hospitals. Srilal who had been receiving treatment at the Ragama General Hospital for five days, had returned to his home at Tawalampitiya, Mirigama two days ago in 13 June. He was admitted to the Meerigama Hospital on 15 April where he died on next day 16th at the age of 66. Funeral took place on Saturday 17 April 2020 at the Malwatta cemetery in Nittambuwa.

Career
Abeykoon was in charge of theatrical costumes of the Tower Hall Theater Foundation at the beginning of his career. Later he has performed on many stage dramas such as Sri Wickrama, Athula V. Samaraweera's plays Sooty Gamrala and Raigam Banda before entering television serials.

In 1981, Abeykoon was selected to the television serial Kopi Kade by Thevis Guruge. His role as "Appuwa" became highly popularized among the public and he was usually known by his character name rather than real name. He appeared in the series from the beginning which first aired on 1 April 1987. He continued to act in the series for more than 30 consecutive years even with illness.

He is a A grade Noorthi Singer of the Sri Lanka Broadcasting Corporation. He also released many music cassettes in mid 1990s. He sang his popular songs for the drama Suuti Gamarala which include, Daskam Vismithai, Maa Premige, Mage Bhaari Obai and Sith Santhoosen. He was a prominent role on the outdoor musical shows island wide during the 1980s and 1990s. During that time, he also released some of Nonstop Cassettes with popular bands around the country including Sunflower. His cassette titled "Raja Kolam" consists with 10 songs. In his next cassette Appuwa 2, he released 12 songs. Abeykoon sang the song Kopi Kade Appu, Mama Wen Na Kulappu became highly popularized in musical shows.

He made his maiden cinematic appearance in 1994 film Sanda Madala directed by Malini Fonseka. Since then, he acted few minor roles in cinema.

Filmography

References

External links
 A Sensational Actor
 Nandamma Na Nedo by Freddi Silva and Srilal Abeykoon
 Emotional response by Suwandaa
 ජනප්‍රිය රංගන ශිල්පී ශ්‍රීලාල් අබේකෝන් අභාවප්‍රාප්ත වෙයි
 Popular actor Srilal Abeykone passed away
 Funeral of Mr. Lal Abeykoon (Appu) today
 ’’කෝපි කඩේ’’ එක්ක හතළිහ සමරයි

Sri Lankan male film actors
Sinhalese male actors
1953 births
2020 deaths
Sri Lankan Buddhists
Sri Lankan playback singers
20th-century Sri Lankan male singers
Sinhalese singers